Héloïse Durant Rose (c. 1853 – March 20, 1943) was an American poet, playwright and critic.

Early life
Héloïse Hannah "Ella" Durant was born in New York City, the daughter of Thomas C. Durant and Héloïse Hannah Timbrell Durant. Her father was a Union Pacific Railroad executive.  Her mother was born in England and immigrated to the United States as a child. Héloïse the younger was educated in Europe.

Career

Writing and literary activities
Books by Durant Rose include Pine Needles, or Sonnets and Songs (1884), Dante: A Dramatic Poem (1892), and A Ducal Skeleton (a novel, 1899).  She wrote short stories for newspapers including the New York Times, and more than a dozen plays, among them a "comedietta" called Our Family Motto, or Noblesse Oblige that was produced in London in 1889 at a hospital fundraiser,  She acted in French in her own play, Un Héros de la Vendée, in London in 1889. 

Her play about the life of Dante was translated into Italian and produced in Verona in 1908. In 1917 Héloïse Durant Rose founded the Dante League of America, in New York City. The District of Columbia League of American Penwomen honored Durant Rose in 1921 for her work promoting Dante.

Philanthropy
Durant was involved in work to give women students more access to classes and examinations at Columbia University in the 1880s. She was founder and chair of the International Association for Housing Students and Travelers from 1912 to 1914.

Héloïse Durant trained as a nurse while she was living in London, and worked caring for poor patients in the city. In 1898 she headed a theatrical fundraiser for the First New York Ambulance Red Cross Equipment Society, which included her own play By the King's Command along with other tableaux and performances.

Lawsuits against brother
Architect William West Durant was Héloïse Durant Rose's only brother. She sued him many times for over forty years, for her portion of their father's estate. The legal battle was reported in detail in newspapers. She even had him arrested in 1898. By the time the courts ruled in her favor,  William Durant had spent much of the money. He declared bankruptcy in 1904, and in 1905 she sued him again, for misappropriation of funds. In 1916 and 1926, she sued him again, because she still had not received her portion.

Personal life and legacy
Rose married twice. Her first husband was Arthur Frethey, a medical student she met in London; she was widowed when he died, just six weeks after their 1891 wedding. She married a Danish man, Charles Heinrich Marcus Rose, in 1895. She had one son, Timbrell Durant Rose (1896-1962). She and Charles moved to St. Petersburg, Florida by 1932, where she was widowed in 1937, and died in 1943, aged about 90 years. A collection of her letters is archived in the Special Collections Research Center, Syracuse University.

Author Sheila Myers wrote a trilogy of novels, Imaginary Brightness, Castles in the Air, and The Night is Done, based on the Durant family, with Ella Durant as one of the main characters.

References

1850s births
1943 deaths
American women poets
American women dramatists and playwrights
Writers from New York City